Jaime Antonio Felipa (13 June 1944 – 6 March 2011) was a judoka who represented the Netherlands Antilles. He competed in the men's heavyweight event at the 1976 Summer Olympics. Felipa won a silver medal in the open category at the 1975 Pan American Games and a bronze in the heavyweight category at the
1979 Pan American Games.

References

External links
 

1944 births
2011 deaths
Dutch Antillean male judoka
Olympic judoka of the Netherlands Antilles
Judoka at the 1976 Summer Olympics
Pan American Games bronze medalists for the Netherlands Antilles
Pan American Games silver medalists for the Netherlands Antilles
Judoka at the 1975 Pan American Games
Pan American Games medalists in judo
People from Willemstad
Medalists at the 1975 Pan American Games